Pillar Point is an American indie pop, synthpop band based out of Seattle, Washington, United States.

Biography
Pillar Point is the solo recording project of Scott Reitherman (also of Throw Me The Statue). In June 2013, the band signed with Polyvinyl Record Co. and unveiled the first single, “Diamond Mine,” which was later released as a 7" on September 3, 2013.

The self-titled full-length album, Pillar Point, was released the following year on February 25, 2014 on Polyvinyl. The album went on to receive press accolades with features in Stereogum, SPIN,<ref>{{Cite web|last=Martins|first=Chris|date=2013-06-28|title=Hear Pillar Point's Surging Synth-Pop Fantasy 'Dreamin|url=https://www.spin.com/2013/06/pillar-point-dreamin-diamond-mine-polyvinyl/|access-date=2023-01-05|website=SPIN|language=en-US}}</ref> and others. Following the album's release, Pillar Point embarked on national tours with of Montreal and Soft Swells.

The band has been remixed by Generationals, Ruby Suns, and Music Go Music. The band's music video for “Dreamin’” was featured on Vimeo’s Staff Picks  VICE premiered the video for "Dove" starring Kia Labeija.

Musicians who have performed with Pillar Point include Lena Simon, Trent Moorman, and Terence Ankeny.

Discography
AlbumsPillar Point (CD/LP/cassette/digital) - Polyvinyl Record Co. - Released February 25, 2014Marble Mouth'' (CD/LP/cassette/digital) - Polyvinyl Record Co. - Released January 22, 2016

Singles
”Diamond Mine” (7"/digital) - Polyvinyl Record Co. - Released September 3, 2013

References

External links
Official website
Band artist page on Polyvinyl Records

Musical groups established in 2013
Indie pop groups from Washington (state)
Musical groups from Seattle
2013 establishments in Washington (state)